Rapa may refer to:

People 
 Oltion Rapa (born 1989), Albanian footballer

Places

 Rapa Nui, the native name of Easter Island, a special territory of Chile
 Rapa Iti, one of the Bass Islands in French Polynesia
 Rapa, Poland, a village in Warmian-Masurian Voivodeship

Rivers
 Rapa River, a tributary of the Lesser Lule River in Sweden
 Râpa (Mureș), a tributary of the River Mureș in Transylvania, Romania
 Râpa (Vișa), a tributary of the Vișa in Sibiu County, Romania

Other uses
 Rapa language, the language of Rapa Iti, in the Austral Islands of French Polynesia
 Rapa (gastropod), a genus of sea snails
 Rapa, a name for the plant rapeseed (Brassica napus)
 Rapa (TV series), a Spanish television series

See also
 Râpa (disambiguation)